The Ankara University, Law School ( formerly known Ankara Adliye Hukuk Mektebi) is a faculty for law of the Ankara University in Turkey.

History 

Ankara University, Law School, was founded as a part of a legal revolution in Turkey by the endeavors of Mahmut Esat Bozkurt. The school was opened by Mustafa Kemal Atatürk, the founder of the Turkish Republic, on November 5, 1925. It was the first modern university-level institution of the newly founded Republic. The Law School had its first graduates in 1928.

Atatürk remarked, "For no other institution do I feel such felicity that I feel for this institution, which will be the warranty of the Republic, and I am glad to reveal and open it" in the opening ceremony thereof.

Authorized abbreviation is AÜHF .

Notable graduates
 Deniz Baykal – politician and former leader of the Republican People's Party
 Jülide Gülizar – one of Turkey's first female news presenters
 Adnan Menderes – former Prime Minister of Turkey
 Ahmet Necdet Sezer – former President of Turkey
 Tülay Tuğcu – former Chief of the Constitutional Court of Turkey
 Kemal Güven – former speaker of the Turkish parliament (1973-1977),
 Uğur Mumcu – investigative journalist for daily Cumhuriyet.
 Turgut Özakman – writer of Şu Çılgın Türkler
 Bülent Arınç – Turkish politician
 Şerafettin Elçi – former Minister of Public Works
 Selahattin Demirtaş – co-leader of the left-wing pro-Kurdish Peoples' Democratic Party
 Kemal Burkay – politician and writer
 Çetin Altan – journalist
 Ece Temelkuran – columnist and writer
 Doğu Perinçek – Turkish politician
 Çiğdem Toker – investigative journalist

See also
Ankara University
Turkish universities

References

External links 
Ankara University, Law School

Law schools in Turkey
Ankara University
Educational institutions established in 1925
1925 establishments in Turkey